Dobroslavtsi (also transcribed as Dobroslavtzi or Dobroslavci) is a village (село) in western Bulgaria, located in the Sofia-city (Sofiya-Grad) Province.

References

Villages in Sofia City Province